Noor Al-Deen Mahmoud Ali Al-Rawabdeh (born 24 February 1997) is a Jordanian professional footballer who plays as a midfielder for Selangor in the Malaysia Super League. He represents the Jordan national team.

International career
Al-Rawabdeh debuted for the Jordan national team in a 1–1 2019 WAFF Championship tie with Kuwait on 8 August 2019.

International goals

Honours
Al-Muharraq
 AFC Cup: 2021
 Bahraini FA Cup: 2021

Al-Jazeera
 Jordan FA Cup: 2017–18

References

External links
 
 
 https://www.utusan.com.my/terkini/2023/03/selangor-pesta-gol-ratah-kuching-city/

1997 births
Living people
Sportspeople from Amman
Jordanian footballers
Jordan international footballers
Jordan youth international footballers
Association football midfielders
Al-Muharraq SC players
Al-Jazeera (Jordan) players
Selangor FA players
Jordanian Pro League players
Bahraini Premier League players
Jordanian expatriate footballers
Jordanian expatriate sportspeople in Bahrain
Jordanian expatriate sportspeople in Malaysia
Expatriate footballers in Bahrain
Expatriate footballers in Malaysia
AFC Cup winning players